Cows is a surreal sitcom produced by Eddie Izzard for Channel 4 in 1997, where all actors appeared in cow suits. Only the pilot episode was produced by Channel 4 and the show never went into series production.
It was written by Nick Whitby and Izzard, and starred Pam Ferris and James Fleet. It was produced by David Tyler.

References 
 http://www.auntiemomo.com/cakeordeath/themannew.html
 https://www.imdb.com/title/tt0189449/

Channel 4 sitcoms